This is a bibliography of Bangalore (or Bengaluru), books about the city, its history, culture, geography, and its people. Many books have been written on the city. Some of the most notable books are The Red Carpet (2005) by Lavanya Sankaran, Bangalored: The Expat Story (2006) by Eshwar Sundaresan, Multiple City: Writings on Bangalore (2008) by Aditi De etc. Other than the books written on Bangalore, there are fictions such as Riddle of the Seventh Stone (2010) by Monideepa Sahu, The Lilac House: A Novel (2012) by Anita Nair, The Lost Girl (2012) by Sangu Mandanna etc. which are set in the city.

A-N

O-Z

See also 
 Bibliography of Boston
 Bibliography of Paris

References 

Bibliographies of cities
Books about India
Bangalore-related lists